Daniil Olegovich Goriachev (born 12 January 1995 in Saint Petersburg, Russia) is a Russian male curler.

Personal life
Goriachev is currently a student at the Saint Petersburg State University.

Awards
 International Class Master of Sports of Russia (curling, 2016).
 Russian Men's Curling Championship: gold (2019).
 Russian Men's Curling Cup: silver (2020).
 World Mixed Curling Championship: gold (2016), bronze (2018).
 Russian Mixed Curling Championship: gold (2016, 2017), silver (2015).
 World Mixed Doubles Curling Championship: silver (2018).
 Russian Mixed Doubles Curling Championship: bronze (2017).

Teams and events

Men's

Mixed

Mixed doubles

Notes

References

External links

Living people
1995 births
Russian male curlers
World curling champions
Russian curling champions
Curlers from Saint Petersburg
World mixed curling champions
Competitors at the 2019 Winter Universiade
Curlers at the 2022 Winter Olympics
Olympic curlers of Russia